, or  (2004) is a Japanese pink film directed by Hidekazu Takahara and starring Sora Aoi. It was released in the US as a DVD in July 2009.

Synopsis
Tsumugi, a girl with a crush on her teacher, discovers that the teacher is having an affair with another teacher. Complications ensue after Tsumugi manages to attract her teacher, but then begins falling for a fellow student.

Cast
 Sora Aoi... Tsumugi Miyamae
 Satoshi Kobayashi... Koshuke Yanagi
 Takashi Naha... Shinichi Katagiri
 Shigeru Nakano... Asu
 Chiyoko Sakamachi... Yoko Shimazaki

Awards
Tsumugi was named fourth best pink film release for 2004 at the "Pink Academy Awards", the Pink Grand Prix. AV idol Sora Aoi was also given a "Best New Actress" award at the ceremony for her performance in this film.

Availability
The film was first released theatrically in Japan on 27 July 2004. Pink Eiga Inc. released the DVD in the US on July 1, 2009 in two versions, a Standard and a Special Edition. The Special Edition contains a behind-the-scene feature, an interview with Sora Aoi, music clips and a 5.1 ch surround soundtrack.

References

External links
 
 
 
 
 

2004 films
2000s erotic films
2000s Japanese-language films
Pink films
Shintōhō Eiga films
2000s pornographic films
Incest in film
2000s Japanese films